Julian Palmieri (born 7 December 1986) is a French professional footballer who last played for French club Gazélec Ajaccio. He has played in Ligue 1 for Lille, in Ligue 2 for SC Bastia, and in Serie B for F.C. Crotone.

Club career

Bastia
In May 2012, it was announced Palmieri would rejoin former club SC Bastia.

On 10 January 2015, Palmieri scored twice as Bastia came from 0–2 down to defeat reigning champions Paris Saint-Germain 4–2.

Lille
On 2 July 2016, out-of-contract Palmieri joined Lille on a two-year contract.

Metz
In November 2017, free agent Palmieri joined FC Metz until the end of the season, to replace Matthieu Udol who had ruptured his cruciate ligaments.

Career statistics

Notes

References

External links
 
 Julian Palmieri career statistics at Topforward

1986 births
Living people
Footballers from Lyon
Association football midfielders
French footballers
Corsica international footballers
Ligue 1 players
Ligue 2 players
Championnat National players
Serie B players
SC Bastia players
F.C. Crotone players
FC Istres players
Paris FC players
Lille OSC players
FC Metz players
Gazélec Ajaccio players
French expatriate footballers
French expatriate sportspeople in Italy
Expatriate footballers in Italy
Footballers from Corsica